The California Baptist Lancers baseball team represents California Baptist University, which is located in Riverside, California. The Lancers are an NCAA Division I college baseball program that competes in the Western Athletic Conference. They began competing in Division I in 2019 and joined the Western Athletic Conference the same season.

The Cal Baptist Lancers play all home games on campus at James W. Totman Stadium. Under the direction of Head Coach Gary Adcock, the Lancers are transitioning from Division II to Division I and are not eligible for postseason play. In their single season in the Western Athletic Conference, they have won one WAC regular season title. In the program's seven years in Division II, the Lancers played in 5 NCAA tournaments.

Since the program's inception, one Lancer, Trevor Oaks, has gone on to play in Major League Baseball. Under current head coach Gary Adcock, 24 Lancers have been drafted, including Tyson Miller who was selected in the fourth round of the 2016 Major League Baseball draft.

Conference membership history (Division I only) 
2019–present: Western Athletic Conference

James W. Totman Stadium 
James W. Totman Stadium is a baseball stadium on the California Baptist campus in Riverside, California that seats 800 people. It opened in 1991 and was renovated in 2007.

Head coaches (Division I only) 
Records taken from the 2019 Complete History Book

Year-by-year NCAA Division I results
Records taken from the 2019 CBU complete history book

Awards and honors (Division I only)

 In their two seasons in the Western Athletic Conference, 2 different Lancers have been named to the all-conference first-team.

Freshman First-Team All-Americans

Western Athletic Conference Pitcher of the Year

Taken from the 2019 CBU complete history book. Updated February 27, 2020.

Lancers in the Major Leagues

Taken from the 2019 CBU complete history book. Updated February 27, 2020.

See also
List of NCAA Division I baseball programs

References